Higher Attestation Commission (abbreviated Cyrillic: ВАК, Latin: VAK) is a name of a national government agency in Russia, Ukraine and some other post-Soviet states that oversees awarding of advanced academic degrees.  Due to translation differences, these committees are sometimes translated as the "State Supreme Certification Commission" or other similar variation; the common Cyrillic-based acronym of VAK remains a constant with all versions.

A commission of a similar kind operated in Bulgaria until 2010, when it was abolished as part of a reorganisation of academic structures.

On December 9, 2010, the Higher Education Commission of Ukraine was merged into the Ministry of Education and Science of Ukraine.

Russia and the former Soviet Union
During the Soviet Union, the Higher Attestation Commission under the USSR Council of Ministers (also abbreviated as VAK) oversaw and controlled the awarding of advanced academic degrees and academic ranks in all of the USSR.  With the fall and break up of the Soviet Union, separate Higher Attestation Commissions arose in the newly independent nations. For example, the Russian agency became the Higher Attestation Commission of the Russian Ministry of Education and Science, taking similar duties in the Russian Federation.

The responsibilities of the Russian Commission include:
 coordinating Dissertation Councils in Russian universities and research institutes;
 promulgating regulations concerning awarding of academic degrees;
 awarding the degrees of Candidate of Sciences and Doctor of Sciences, upon the recommendation of the Dissertation Council in the university or research institute where the defense of the dissertation took place;
 awarding the academic rank of Professor;
 making decisions on equivalence of foreign degrees awarded to Russian citizens.

Since 2016-2019, some (29, as of June 2020) top-level educational and scientific establishments in Russia, e.g. Moscow State University, were granted the right to award degrees independently, i.e. without a control, of the VAK; there are voices against extension of this option.

The Higher Attestation Commissions in other nations have similar responsibilities.

Fields of study
Scientific degrees awarded VAK were classified into an established list of specialties, grouped into the following major sections

positions 20.xx.xx were occupied by military sciences, position 21.xx.xx are kept in reserve since abolition of "naval sciences" at 1980th.

See also
 Dissernet

References

External links
 Higher Attestation Commission of the Ministry of Education and Science of Russian Federation  (official site) 
 Higher Attestation Commission of Ukraine (official site)  
 Higher Attestation Commission of the Republic of Belarus (official site)  
 Higher Attestation Commission of the Republic of Uzbekistan (official site) 
 Higher Attestation Commission of Bulgaria (official site) 

Science and technology in Russia
Education in Russia
Education in the Soviet Union
Education in Ukraine
Science and technology in Ukraine
Science and technology in the Soviet Union
Science and technology in Belarus
Education in Belarus
Educational organizations based in Belarus